Agnia fasciata is a species of beetle in the family Cerambycidae. It was described by Francis Polkinghorne Pascoe in 1859. It is known from the Moluccas.

References

Lamiini
Beetles described in 1859